Evert van Benthem (born 21 November 1958) is a Dutch former speed skater who won the rarely raced Elfstedentocht twice in a row, in 1985 and 1986.

Early career
Van Benthem, a farmer from Leeuwte, near Vollenhove in The Netherlands, became involved in marathon skating in the early 1980s. He started racing in the A-class in 1983, which involved longer races (100 km instead of 40 km), and finished third in the Dutch championship in 1985.

Elfstedentocht 1985
In 1985, it had been 22 years since the last Elfstedentocht. On 21 February 1985, van Benthem won the 13th Elfstedentocht. Van Benthem entered the final stretch of the race into Leeuwarden together with Jan Kooiman, Jos Niesten and Henri Ruitenberg, all marathon speed skaters.

Elfstedentocht 1986
One year later, on 26 February 1986, the competition was held again. The leading pack near the end of the race included, Rein Jonker, Robert Kamperman and van Benthem. Van Benthem kept the lead and won again, with a time of 6 hours 55 mins 17 secs.

Elfstedentocht 1997
The next Elfstedentocht took place in 1997, after van Benthem's retirement. He still entered the event but without trying to win, drawing much public attention. His brother, Henk van Benthem, finished fourth in the race.

Emigration
In the summer of 1999 van Benthem and his family decided to move to Spruce View, Alberta, Canada. His farm in the Netherlands was located in a natural preservation area and thus could not expand. Moreover, Van Benthem said he had gotten tired of the attention. Van Benthem has a dairy farm in Spruce View, 320 hectares in size with 175 cows. An "Alternative Elfstedentocht" has been organized since 2003, but van Benthem's goal of having the Dutch top skaters regularly competing has not come to fruition.

References

1958 births
Living people
Dutch male speed skaters
Dutch emigrants to Canada
People from Steenwijkerland
Sportspeople from Overijssel